Reginald Arthur Shooter  (4 April 1916 – 24 December 2013) was a British microbiologist.  He led the enquiry into the 1978 smallpox outbreak in the United Kingdom and was appointed a CBE in the 1980 Birthday Honours. He retired in 1981.

Reginald Shooter's oldest child, and only son, was Adrian Shooter, the railway manager best known for leading Chiltern Railways after the privatisation of British Rail and for forming the Vivarail engineering company.

References 
}

1916 births
2013 deaths
British microbiologists
Commanders of the Order of the British Empire
Fellows of the Royal College of Surgeons
Fellows of the Royal College of Pathologists